Killshot or Kill Shot may refer to:

Film and television
Killshot (film), a 2008 American thriller film
"Killshot", a 1994 episode of High Tide
"Killshot", a 1995 episode of Deadly Games
"Killshot", a 1984 episode of Miami Vice
"Killshot", a 2009 episode of NCIS: Los Angeles

Literature
Killshot (novel), a 1989 novel by Elmore Leonard
Kill Shot, a 2012 novel by Vince Flynn

Music
"Killshot" (song), a 2018 song by Eminem
"Killshot", a 2009 song by Ben Frost from By the Throat

Other uses
Killshot (wrestler) or Shane Strickland, American professional wrestler
Kill Shot (video game), a 2014 mobile video game by Hothead Games

See also
Dead Shot (disambiguation)